Anja Monke (born 28 May 1977) is a German professional golfer. She has played on the Ladies European Tour since 2004.

Monke was born in Herford. In 2003, she won the International Amateur Championships of Switzerland and Italy, and was voted German Ladies Amateur Golfer of the Year. In Autumn, with a  handicap of +3, she turned professional.

Monke played for Germany with Miriam Nagl in 2006 and with Denise Simon in 2007 in the Women's World Cup of Golf in South Africa.

In September 2008, she won her first professional tournament, the Vediorbis Open de France Dames. She then qualified for the LPGA Tour. In December 2008, she won the Dubai Ladies Masters.

Professional wins

Ladies European Tour (3)
2008 (2) Vediorbis Open de France Dames, Dubai Ladies Masters
2010 (1) Lalla Meryem Cup

Team appearances
Amateur

 European Ladies' Team Championship (representing Germany): 2003

Professional
World Cup (representing Germany): 2006, 2007

References

External links

German female golfers
Ladies European Tour golfers
LPGA Tour golfers
People from Herford
Sportspeople from Detmold (region)
Sportspeople from Hanover
1977 births
Living people